Lebanon–Mexico relations are the diplomatic relations between Lebanon and Mexico. Both nations enjoy friendly relations, the importance of which centers on the history of Lebanese immigration to Mexico. Both nations are members of the Group of 24 and the United Nations.

History 

Relations between Mexico and Lebanon stretch further before their official establishment of diplomatic relations. Beginning in 1878, several thousand Lebanese migrants (primarily Christian Maronites) left their homes, which at the time were under Ottoman occupation and later followed by French colonization; and immigrated to Mexico. Today, over 500,000 people in Mexico are of Lebanese origin ranking Mexico the fourth biggest country hosting a Lebanese community outside of Lebanon.

After gaining independence from France in 1943; Lebanon and Mexico established diplomatic relations on 12 June 1945. In 1947, diplomatic missions were established in each country's capitals respectively, and ambassadors were appointed.  In 1975, Lebanon experienced a civil war and for security reasons, the embassy of Mexico in Beirut closed in June 1982 to only re-open in 1996. Since then, Mexico has maintained an embassy in Lebanon throughout the various violent outbreaks in Lebanon and during Israeli attacks in the country.

In June 2000, Mexican Foreign Minister Rosario Green became the first highest ranking Mexican official to visit Lebanon. In Lebanon, Foreign Minister Green met with Lebanese President Émile Lahoud. In September 2010, Lebanese President Michel Sleiman became the first Lebanese head-of-state to pay an official visit to Mexico and met with Mexican President Felipe Calderón.

In February 2015, Lebanese Foreign Minister Gebran Bassil arrived to Mexico to discuss the festivities for celebrating the 70th anniversary of diplomatic relations between both nations. In May 2015, Mexican Foreign Minister José Antonio Meade paid an official visit to Lebanon. Since September 2015, Mexico has military experts and two soldiers assigned to the United Nations Interim Force in Lebanon, based in the south of Lebanon and currently maintains 30 personnel in the country. In November 2015, the Patriarch of the Maronite Church, Bechara Boutros al-Rahi paid a visit to Mexico and met with Mexican President Enrique Peña Nieto. Both nations celebrated 70 years of diplomatic relations in 2015.

In November 2017, Lebanese Foreign Minister Gebran Bassil paid a visit to Mexico to attend the Lebanese Diaspora Conference for Latin America and the Caribbean, held in Cancún.

High-level visits
High-level visits from Lebanon to Mexico

 President Michel Sleiman (2010)
 Foreign Minister Ali Al Shami (2010)
 Foreign Minister Gebran Bassil (2015, 2017)

High-level visits from Mexico to Lebanon
 Foreign Minister Rosario Green  (2000)
 Foreign Undersecretary Lourdes Aranda (2010)
 Foreign Minister José Antonio Meade (2015)

Bilateral relations 
Both nations have signed several bilateral agreements such as a Memorandum of Understanding and Cooperation between the Mexican Secretariat of Foreign Affairs and the Lebanese Ministry of Foreign Affairs (2000); Agreement of Scientific and Technical Cooperation (2000); Agreement of Educational and Cultural Cooperation (2000) and a Memorandum of Understanding and Cooperation between the Mexican Secretariat for Tourism and the Lebanese Ministry of Tourism (2008).

Trade relations 
In 2018, total trade between both nations amounted to US$36 million. Lebanon is Mexico's 111th largest trading partner globally and 12th in the Middle-East. Between 2013 - 2017, Lebanese companies invested US$110 million in Mexico, mainly in the agricultural and manufacturing industries. In 2015, both nations discussed the possibility of creating a free trade agreement.

Resident diplomatic missions 
 Lebanon has an embassy in Mexico City.
 Mexico has an embassy in Beirut.

See also
 Lebanese Mexicans

References 

 
Mexico
Bilateral relations of Mexico